Untamed is the third book in Sara Humphreys’s The Amoveo Legend Series. It takes place some months after the events in Untouched.

Awards
PRISM Double Award Winner 2013 
Best of the Best
Dark Paranormal/Urban Fantasy

References

Amoveo Legend
2012 American novels
American romance novels
Sourcebooks books